Europium(II) sulfate is the inorganic compound with the formula EuSO4.  Two polymorphs are known, α and the more stable β.  Both are colorless.  The β polymorph is isostructural with barium sulfate, hence it is insoluble in water.  The salt is generated by addition of soluble europium(II) salts to dilute sulfuric acid.

References

Europium(II) compounds
Sulfates